Tilahun (Amharic: ጥላሁን) is a male name of Ethiopian origin that may refer to:

Tilahun Gessesse (1940–2009), Ethiopian singer
Tilahun Regassa (born 1990), Ethiopian long-distance runner
Yohannes Tilahun (born 1993), Eritrea international footballer

Amharic-language names